Ruslan Rishatovich Nagayev (born 14 February 1989) is a Russian former football forward.

Career
Nagayev made his professional debut for FC Rubin Kazan on 5 August 2008 in the Russian Cup game against FC Smena Komsomolsk-na-Amure. He also appeared for Rubin in the next season's Russian Cup, on 15 July 2009 against FC Volga Tver.

External links
 
 
 
 

1989 births
Footballers from Kazan
Living people
Russian footballers
Association football forwards
FC Rubin Kazan players